Howland is an English surname. Notable people with the surname include:

Alfred Cornelius Howland (1838–1909), American painter
Ben Howland (born 1957), American college basketball coach
Benjamin Howland (1755–1821), United States Senator from Rhode Island
Beth Howland (1941–2015), American stage and television actress
Bette Howland (1937–2017), American writer and literary critic
Chris Howland (1928–2013), British radio and television presenter
Christopher Howland (1936–2010), English cricketer
David Howland (born 1986), Northern Irish footballer
Edna Howland (1886–1964), American vaudeville artist
Edwin Howland (1838–1876), American architect
Eliza Howland (1826–1917), American author
Emily Howland (1827–1929), American philanthropist and educator
Esther Allen Howland (1801–1860), American cookbook author
Esther Howland (1828–1904), American artist and businesswoman
Fred Howland (1864–1953), Vermont attorney, businessman, and Republican politician
Jason Howland (born 1971), American composer
Jobyna Howland (1880–1936), American stage and screen actress
John Howland (1592/3–1672/3), Mayflower passenger and early settler in the United States
John Howland (doctor) (1873–1926), American pediatrician
Joe Wiseman Howland (1908–1978), American researcher in radiation toxicity, health and safety
Joseph Howland (1834–1886), American Civil War veteran who later served as New York State Treasurer
Marie Howland (1836–1921), American feminist writer
Mark Howland (born 1954), Massachusetts politician
Meredith Howland (1833–1912), American soldier and society man 
Olin Howland (1886–1959), American film and theatre actor
Oliver Howland (1847–1905), Canadian lawyer and political figure
Paul Howland (1865–1942), American lawyer and politician
Richard Howland (1540–1600), English academic and bishop
Robert Howland (1905–1986), English track and field athlete
Russell Howland (1908–1995), American music educator
Samuel Shaw Howland (1790–1853), American businessman
William Howland (disambiguation), several people

See also
Howlin (surname)

English-language surnames